Jill Kendrick Holtzman Vogel (née Holtzman, July 6, 1970) is an American attorney and politician serving as the Virginia State Senator from the 27th district since 2008. A  Republican, her district is located in exurban and rural parts of Northern Virginia, and it includes all of Clarke, Fauquier, and Frederick counties, Winchester city, as well as pieces of Culpeper, Loudoun, and Stafford counties.

Early and family life
Born in Roanoke, Virginia, Vogel's family started a small business, Holtzman Oil Company, which eventually grew into an enterprise employing over 600 people in Virginia. Vogel attended the College of William and Mary in Williamsburg, Virginia, and received a B.A. degree in government and religion. She then attended DePaul University's Law School in Chicago, Illinois, and received a J.D. degree.

Political career
A member of the Virginia and Washington D.C. bars, Vogel did legal work for charitable and nonprofit organizations, as well as campaign finance and ethics. Vogel served as Deputy General Counsel in the Department of Energy, before starting her own law firm, Holtzman Vogel Josefiak Torchinsky. Vogel became the Chief Counsel of the Republican National Committee in February 2004. Previously, she had  been Deputy Chief Counsel, and was involved in the 2000 Florida recount and as a staff counsel at the 1996 Republican National Convention.

She was elected to the Senate of Virginia as a Republican in 2007, after long-term state senator Russ Potts retired. She represents much of the territory that was once represented by former Governor and U. S. Senator Harry F. Byrd Sr. and former U. S. Senator Harry F. Byrd Jr. It was one of the first areas of Virginia to turn Republican; the GOP has held the seat without interruption since Harry Jr.'s appointment to the U. S. Senate in 1965.

Vogel faced a contentious race in 2007, winning by only 661 votes over Winchester School Board Trustee Karen Schultz as the Democrats regained control of the Senate. She was re-elected by a wider margin in 2011.

In 2015, Vogel's candidacy for reelection was unopposed. She became the Caucus Whip for the Republican party in the state Senate.

In 2017, after an unusually bitter primary battle, Vogel became the Republican nominee for Lieutenant Governor of Virginia in 2017. She lost to Democrat Justin Fairfax in the general election on November 7, 2017.

In 2019 Vogel was reelected to the Virginia State Senate. Also in 2019, Vogel was presented with the Legislator of the Year award from the Virginia Professional Fire Fighters organization.

In December 2021, The Daily Beast reported that Vogel had done substantial work for Kanye West's 2020 presidential campaign as part of a larger astroturfing effort by the Republican Party on behalf of West's candidacy.

Policy positions

Abortion 

In 2012, Vogel attracted nationwide media attention for a bill she introduced requiring abortion clinics to administer transvaginal ultrasounds, which she described as necessary for fully informed consent.

Gun rights 

In 2016, she introduced legislation to allow victims of domestic violence to more easily and quickly obtain concealed weapons permits.

Child marriage 

In 2016, she also gained nationwide media attention for helping repeal laws that allowed "child marriage" involving pregnant minors.

Redistricting reform 
In 2017, she sought to curb gerrymandering by introducing a bill establishing more specific criteria for redistricting in Virginia. She also introduced legislation to legalize medicinal use of non-psychoactive cannabis oils for a range of conditions.

LGBT rights 

In the January 2020 session of the legislature, Vogel was the only Republican in the Senate who voted in favor of a ban on conversion therapy. In the same session, Vogel also voted in favor of a bill which would make it easier for transgender Virginians to change the sex listed on their birth certificates and a bill which would repeal Virginia's defunct ban on same-sex marriage.

Electoral history

References

Sources

External links

Jill Vogel's official website
Jill Vogel's campaign site
Senate of Virginia page about Jill Vogel
Virginia Public Access Project page about Jill Vogel
Jill Vogel at Ballotpedia
Project Vote Smart – Senator Jill Vogel (VA) profile
Our Campaigns – Senator Jill Vogel (VA) profile

|-

1970 births
21st-century American politicians
21st-century American women politicians
College of William & Mary alumni
DePaul University College of Law alumni
Living people
People from Fauquier County, Virginia
Politicians from Roanoke, Virginia
Virginia lawyers
Republican Party Virginia state senators
Women state legislators in Virginia